The Nigerian Investment Promotion Commission (NIPC) is a specialized agency of the Federal Government of Nigeria, established through the Nigerian Investment Promotion Act Chapter N117 of 2004. It is aimed at encouraging, promoting, and coordinating all investments in Nigeria. The Federal Government of Nigeria, has tasked the investment promotion agency with attracting Foreign Direct Investment (FDI) over the years.

Origin
The Nigerian Investment Promotion Commission was established by the United Nations Conference on Trade and Development through Chapter N117 of the Nigerian Investment Promotion Act of 1995, and later became a specialized agency of the Federal Government of Nigeria through Chapter N117 of the Nigerian Investment Promotion Act of 2004 by the former President of Nigeria Olusegun Aremu Obasanjo in a bid to enhance Nigeria’s investment climate, attract foreign investments and deviate from oil as the major growth rate of the Nigerian economy. The then President appointed his former Minister for Commerce, Engr. Mustapha Bello as the pioneer Executive Secretary/CEO of the Commission  and invited Mr Felix Ohiwerei, a boardroom guru, as the Chair of the Governing Board.

The commission was established to enhance Nigeria’s investment climate, attract foreign investments and deviate from oil as the major growth rate of the Nigerian economy. Nigerian President, Olusegun Aremu Obasanjo appointed a former Minister for Commerce, Mustapha Bello as the pioneer Executive Secretary/CEO of the Commission, as well as Felix Ohiwerei, as the Chair of the Governing Board.

Mission and functions
NIPC’s role is designed to proactively promote Nigeria as an investment haven, and to stimulate foreign direct investments, as FDI’s aid a Nation’s development. The functions of the Commission include; 

 Be the agency of the Federal Government to coordinate and monitor all investment promotion activities to which this Act applies
 Initiate and support measures that enhance the investment climate in Nigeria for both Nigerian and non- Nigerian investors
 Promote investments in and outside Nigeria through effective promotional means
 Collect, collate, analyse and disseminate information about investment opportunities and sources of investment capital, and advise on request, the availability, choice or suitability of partners in joint-venture projects
 Register and keep records of enterprises to which this Act applies
 Identify specific projects and invite interested investors for participation in those projects
 Initiate, organise and participate in promotional activities such as exhibitions, conferences and seminars to stimulate investments
 Maintain liaison between investors and ministries, government departments and agencies, institutional lenders and other authorities concerned with investments
 Provide and disseminate up-to-date information on incentives available to investors
 Assist incoming and existing investors by providing support services
 Evaluate the impact of the Commission in investments in Nigeria and make appropriate recommendations
 Advise the Federal Government on policy matters including fiscal measures designed to promote the industrialisation of Nigeria or the general development of the economy
 Perform such functions as are supplementary or incidental to the attainment of the objectives of the Act.

Pioneer Status Incentives
The Pioneer Status Incentive (PSI) is a tax relief program aiming to lower the cost of doing business in Nigeria by providing investment incentives to "pioneer" enterprises and businesses with high volume capacity. It also offers solutions to some of the government's human resource issues. The Company is not required to pay corporate income tax, which improves its profitability and long-term viability. The Federal Government of Nigeria, through the Executive Council, granted certain exemptions in accordance with Ministry of Industry, Trade, and Investment standards. If the guidelines are broken, the NIPC compiles a list of potential beneficiaries and either processes the PSI application or cancels the pioneer certificates.
PSI is a three-year tax vacation that exempts qualified products and industries from paying corporate tax, with the option to extend it for another year.

One-Stop-Shop
The One-Stop Investment Centre (OSIC) brings together essential government entities to provide investors with expedited services. There are now 27 participant agencies in the OSIC.— Central Bank of Nigeria, Corporate Affairs Commission, Department of Petroleum Resources, Federal Capital Territory Administration, Federal Inland Revenue Service, Federal Ministry of Budget and National Planning, Federal Ministry of Finance, Federal Ministry of Interior, Federal Ministry of Mines and Steel Development, Infrastructure Concession Regulatory Commission, Manufacturers Association of Nigeria, Ministry of Foreign Affairs, National Agency for Food and Drug Administration and Control, National Bureau of Statistics, Nigerian Copyright Commission, Nigeria Customs Service, Nigerian Export Promotion Council, Nigerian Electricity Regulatory Commission, Nigerian Export Processing Zones Authority, Nigeria Immigration Service, Nigerian Maritime Administration and Safety Agency, New Nigeria Development Company, National Office for Technology Acquisition & Promotion, Odu’a Investment Company Limited, Oil & Gas Free Trade Zones Authority, Pharmacists Council of Nigeria and Standards Organisation of Nigeria.

Administration
NIPC has a Governing council that comprises  a Chairman, four independent members, the Executive Secretary/CEOs' permanent secretaries of seven ministries including; Federal Ministry of Industry, Trade and Investment; Federal Ministry of Information and Culture, Federal Ministry of Finance, Federal Ministry of Budget and National Planning, Federal Ministry of Foreign Affairs, Federal Ministry of Interior, Federal Ministry of Petroleum, Governor, Central Bank of Nigeria and six members from the private sector.  

The Commission’s Governing Council is chaired by Rt. Hon. Dr Babangida S.M. Nguroje OFR. The Executive Secretary of the Commission is Saratu Altine Umar. The organogram of the Commission has seven specialized departments — Finance & Administration, Investment Promotion, Investor Relations, Human Resources, Policy Advocacy, States Coordination and Strategic Communications. The Commission was structured to consist of North-Central, North-East, North-West, South-East and South-West Zonal offices to work with sub-national state investment agencies in the coordinating and further actualization of the Federal Government’s mandate.

Leadership
Yewande Sadiku is the Executive Secretary/Chief Executive Officer of the Nigerian Investment Promotion Commission (NIPC). Prior to her appointment, Hajiya Ladi Katagu was the Commission's Acting Executive Secretary. In 2015, the former President Goodluck Ebele Jonathan relieved the appointment of Saratu Altine Umar.

Governing Council
NIPC has a Governing council that comprises a Chairman, four independent members, the Executive Secretary/CEOs', permanent secretaries of seven ministries including; Federal Ministry of Industry, Trade and Investment; Federal Ministry of Information and Culture, Federal Ministry of Finance, Federal Ministry of Budget and National Planning, Federal Ministry of Foreign Affairs, Federal Ministry of Interior, Federal Ministry of Petroleum, Governor of the Central Bank of Nigeria and six members from the private sector.

Organisational structure
The Commission’s Governing Council is chaired by Rt. Hon. Dr Babangida S.M. Nguroje OFR. The Executive Secretary’s office is headed by Yewande Sadiku. The organogram of the Commission has seven specialised departments — Finance & Administration, Investment Promotion, Investor Relations, Human Resources, Policy Advocacy, States Coordination and Strategic Communications. 
Furthermore, the Commission was structured to consist of North-Central, North-East, North-West, South-East and South-West Zonal offices to work with sub-national state investment agencies in the coordinating and further actualisation of the Federal Government’s mandate.

Awards and recognition
In 2019 the NIPC was awarded a Silver recognition award by EIE Nigeria for Compliance and Transparency.

References

Government agencies of Nigeria
Investment promotion agencies
Investment in Nigeria